MeritHall Inc is a staffing agency headquartered in Detroit, Michigan. They provide staffing services and the brokerage of bulk road salt for clients in the industries of Landscaping, Snow removal, Construction, & Facility Maintenance

Company history
MeritHall Inc was originally envisioned as a technology company, centered around an online marketplace construction contractors could use to search for employees. The company was restructured with less of a focus on technology and in 2013 it began taking on landscaping and snow removal clients. The company is headquartered in the historic Harmonie Centre building in downtown Detroit. On July 22, 2014 Senator Carl Levin referenced MeritHall Inc in a speech before Congress to argue for the efficacy of the Intermediary Lending Program, which facilitates loans for small businesses.

Press Coverage

 All Stars of Snow & Ice by Snow Business magazine December 2014
 What Entrepreneur360 'Controllers' Know: Watch Markets and Keep the Customer Happy by Entrepreneur magazine October 2015
 #1 Fastest Growing Company in Detroit by Inc. magazine August 2015

References

Companies based in Detroit
Human resource management associations